

Digico was a British computer company founded in 1965 by Keith Trickett and Avo Hiiemae, two ex-ICL electronics engineers.  Former MP Eric Lubbock became chairman in 1969. The company was based in Letchworth initially, moving to a new factory in Stevenage in 1973 and employing about 90 staff.

Digico's first product was a laboratory data-logging and spectrum analyser hardware system named DIGIAC. This product had been developed before Digico was formed, so was an immediate source of income. Digico soon developed a 16-bit minicomputer series, the Micro 16, for which it was best known for.

Digico Micro 16
Digico quickly started developing a general purpose single accumulator 16-bit minicomputer, the Micro 16, which became available in 1966. Digico was assisted by the Ministry of Technology and the National Research Development Corporation in this development. The first version produced was the Digico Micro 16S (1968), followed by the 16P (1970), then  the 16V in 1972.

The Digico Micro 16V had a standard memory of 4k words with 950 nano second cycle time, expandable to 64k words, and able to support up to 64 external interfaces. It had an optional microprogrammed floating-point unit. The Micro 16V was supported by a simple and flexibly sized executive that could optionally support multiprogramming, disc files and teletypes. The Micro 16V used semiconductor memory, rather than magnetic-core memory as in the previous models.

Digico primarily sold into the data logging market until 1969, when it expanded into areas like process control, stock control and front-end processors for the ICL 1900 mainframe. In 1974 Digico had a turnover of over £1 million (equivalent to £ million in ) and in 1977 well over £1 million.

In 1978 the Digico Micro 16E stackable minicomputer, which was well suited to an office environment, won a Design Council Award for Engineering Products.

See also
Computer Technology Limited
PDP-8

References

External links
Digico Micro 16V, Time-Line Computer Archive (with extensive photos)
Logic Diagrams for a Digico micro 16V c1972, 

1965 establishments in England
Companies based in Herefordshire
Computer companies established in 1965
Defunct computer companies of the United Kingdom
Minicomputers